James S. Munro (November 22, 1846 – after 1908) was an American-born agent and politician in Ontario, Canada. He represented Oxford North in the Legislative Assembly of Ontario from 1904 to 1908 as a Liberal.

He was born in New York City and was educated in Ontario. In 1878, Munro married Adelaide Hirtch. He was first elected to the Ontario assembly in a 1904 by-election and was reelected in 1905.

References

External links

1846 births
Year of death missing
Ontario Liberal Party MPPs